The Last Moments of Napoleon is a book by Francesco Antommarchi, Napoleon I's physician.

Publishing History 
The two-volume Mémoires du docteur F. Antommarchi, ou Les derniers momens de Napoléon was published in 1825 in Paris by Barrois l'aîné.

References 
 French National Library Bibliographical reference
 French text of Mémoires du docteur F. Antommarchi, ou Les derniers momens de Napoléon - Barrois l'aîné (Paris) - 1825

1825 non-fiction books
French books
Books about Napoleon